The eleventh series of the Australian cooking game show MasterChef Australia premiered on 29 April 2019 on Network 10. It was the final season where Gary Mehigan, George Calombaris and Matt Preston served as judges.

This series was won by Larissa Takchi in the grand finale against Tessa Boersma and Simon Toohey, broadcast on 23 July 2019.

Changes
Former contestants Poh Ling Yeow, Billie McKay and Matt Sinclair replaced Shannon Bennett as the contestants' mentors.

The finale featured three finalists instead of two.

Contestants

Top 24
The Top 24 were announced on 29–30 April 2019.

Future appearances

 Tessa Boersma and Simon Toohey appeared on Series 12. Simon was eliminated on 7 June 2020, finishing 11th and Tessa was eliminated on 28 June 2020, finishing 7th.

Guest chefs

Elimination chart

Episodes and ratings
 Colour key:
  – Highest rating during the series
  – Lowest rating during the series

References

External links
 Official Website

MasterChef Australia
2019 Australian television seasons